Evening; Red Tree is a 1908–1910 oil on canvas painting by the Dutch artist Piet Mondrian in the Gemeentemuseum Den Haag.

History
This painting shows the artist's luminist period where he painted realistically but with brighter than actual colors and simplifying contours. This painting is a cross-over to his more rectangular and analytical style. Mondrian painted this painting in the Zeeland coastal resort of Domburg, at that time a popular artist's colony in the summer months. His trees illustrate his shift towards abstract cubism:.

During his first stay in Domburg, Mondrian reportedly made sketches of an apple tree in the garden of the Villa Loverendale, the home of Marie Tak van Poortvliet and her friend, the painter Jacoba van Heemskerck. The painting was completed during a subsequent visit to Domburg.

Exhibitions
It was exhibited twice during Mondrian's lifetime; the first time at the exhibition Schilderijen en teekeningen door C. Spoor, Piet Mondriaan en Jan Sluyters in the Stedelijk Museum, Amsterdam in 1909. In 1910 it was shown at the 20th annual exhibition of members of :nl:Kunstenaarsvereniging Sint Lucas in Amsterdam. It was sold for 500 guilders to Marie Tak van Poortvliet.

References

Sources

External links
 artwork record on Europeana website

1900s paintings
Paintings by Piet Mondrian
Paintings in the Netherlands